Hurnville is an unincorporated community on Farm to Market Road 1197 eight miles north of Henrietta in north central Clay County, Texas, United States.

History
Founded in 1890, it became an island of German American settlers, primarily Russians of German descent, in an otherwise Anglo-dominated county.  Numerous German American communities developed in north central Texas, particularly in Archer and Cooke Counties.  Each were different and most identified with a particular church.  Hurnville established a German Baptist Church in 1894, the center of the tight-knit community.  A post office served the small community from 1891 to 1905.  Plagued by isolation and distance from main thoroughfares and railroads, the town never really flourished and by 1930 the population was only 20 with two local businesses.  Today, the town is nothing more than a small collection of houses as settlers have assimilated and moved on to more prosperous areas.

Education
The Hurnville area is served by the Henrietta Independent School District and the Petrolia Independent School District.

References

Unincorporated communities in Texas
Unincorporated communities in Clay County, Texas
Wichita Falls metropolitan area
1890 establishments in Texas
Populated places established in 1890